The Oldenburg–Osnabrück railway is a single-track, non-electrified railway line from Oldenburg to Osnabrück, both in the German state of Lower Saxony.

The line was opened in two stages between 1875 and 1876. The first section from Oldenburg to Quakenbrück was built between 1870 and 1875 by the Grand Duchy of Oldenburg State Railways (GOE). The opening of the first section took place on 15 October 1875. The section from Quakenbrück to Osnabrück-Eversburg, then passing through Prussian territory, opened only a year later, on 30 June 1876. The official opening took place on 15 November 1876.

Until the mid-1990s there was a modest long distance train connection over the line. There was a daily express train from Koblenz and Cologne to Wilhelmshaven and a train from Mönchengladbach to Wilhelmshaven.

Since 2000, the infrastructure was expanded to introduce a train service with shorter journey times and better connections. Part of the development was to increase the maximum line speed to 120 km/h and the closure of little used stations. The travel time decreased as a result between Oldenburg and Osnabrück by 22 minutes to 87 minutes. In Oldenburg good connections were created with the regional/Intercity trains on the line between Bremen and Emden. The travel time between Wilhelmshaven and Osnabrück also fell by 45 minutes.

The services on the line have been operated by NordWestBahn since November 2000. The current contract continues until December 2026.

Usage
The line is used by the following service(s):

Regional services Wilhelmshaven - Varel - Oldenburg - Cloppenburg - Bramsche - Osnabrück
Local services Osnabrück - Bramsche - Vechta - Delmenhorst - Bremen between Osnabrück and Hesepe

References

This article is based upon a translation of the Italian language version as at December 2015.

External links 

Railway lines opened in 1875
Railway lines in North Rhine-Westphalia
Railway lines in Lower Saxony